In chemistry, an ester is a compound derived from an acid (organic or inorganic) in which the hydrogen atom (H) of at least one acidic hydroxyl group of that acid is replaced by an organyl group. According to some authors, organyl derivatives of acidic hydrogen of other acids are esters as well (e.g. amides), but not according to the IUPAC.

An example of an ester formation is the substitution reaction between a carboxylic acid and an alcohol (R'OH), forming an ester, where R and R′ are organyl groups, or H in the case of esters of formic acid. Glycerides, which are fatty acid esters of glycerol, are important esters in biology, being one of the main classes of lipids, and making up the bulk of animal fats and vegetable oils. Esters of carboxylic acids with low molecular weight are commonly used as fragrances and found in essential oils and pheromones. Phosphoesters form the backbone of DNA molecules. Nitrate esters, such as nitroglycerin, are known for their explosive properties, while polyesters are important plastics, with monomers linked by ester moieties. Esters of carboxylic acids usually have a sweet smell and are considered high-quality solvents for a broad array of plastics, plasticizers, resins, and lacquers. They are also one of the largest classes of synthetic lubricants on the commercial market.

By number of alkyl group carbons

1 carbon

2 carbons

3 carbons

4 carbons

5 carbons

7 carbons

8 carbons

10 carbons

By number of acid group carbons

0 carbons

1 carbon

2 carbons

3 carbons

4 carbons

5 carbons

6 carbons

7 carbons

8 carbons

9 carbons

10 carbons

16 carbons

List of ester odorants 
Many esters of carboxylic acid have distinctive fruit-like odors, and many occur naturally in fruits and the essential oils of plants. This has also led to their common use in artificial flavorings and fragrances which aim to mimic those odors.

Lactones
Lactones are a specific class cyclic carboxylic esters that are formed through intramolecular esterification.

References

Esters
Esters